Amravati Municipal Corporation is the governing body of the city of Amravati in the Indian state of Maharashtra. The municipal corporation consists of democratically elected members, is headed by a mayor and administers the city's infrastructure, public services and police. Members from the state's leading various political parties hold elected offices in the corporation. Municipal Corporation mechanism in India was introduced during British Rule with formation of municipal corporation in Madras (Chennai) in 1688, later followed by municipal corporations in Bombay (Mumbai) and Calcutta (Kolkata) by 1762. Amravati Municipal Corporation is headed by Mayor of city and governed by Commissioner.

Amravati municipal corporation is located in Amravati City. Amravati Municipal Corporation has been formed with functions to improve the infrastructure of town.

List of M

ayor

List of Deputy Mayor

Revenue sources 

The following are the Income sources for the corporation from the Central and State Government.

Revenue from taxes 
Following is the Tax related revenue for the corporation.

 Property tax.
 Profession tax.
 Entertainment tax.
 Grants from Central and State Government like Goods and Services Tax.
 Advertisement tax.

Revenue from non-tax sources 

Following is the Non Tax related revenue for the corporation.

 Water usage charges.
 Fees from Documentation services.
 Rent received from municipal property.
 Funds from municipal bonds.

Corporation Election 2017

Political Performance in Election 2017 
Amravati Municipal Corporation elections were conducted in February 2017.

Corporation Election 2012

Political Performance in Election 2012 
Amravati Municipal Corporation elections were conducted in February 2012.

Nominated Corporators (2012-2017) 

A total of 5 corporators were nominated based on the strength of the parties in the corporation after the 2012 elections. These 5 corporators are as follows :-

Indian National Congress (2) - Vasantrao Saulkar, Amol Thakre

Nationalist Congress Party (1) - Asif Hussain Muzzafar Hussain

Shiv Sena (1) - Komal Bothra

Bharatiya Janata Party (1) - Ajay Samadekar

Corporation Election 2007

References 

Amravati
Municipal corporations in Maharashtra
Year of establishment missing